The Comoro catshark (Scyliorhinus comoroensis) is a rare catshark of the family Scyliorhinidae. The holotype and only specimen was taken from the Comoros Islands in the Indian Ocean, at a depth of 400 m. The Comoro catshark is not well-documented. The reproduction of this catshark is oviparous.

References 

Comoro catshark
Fish of the Comoros
Endemic fauna of the Comoros
Comoro catshark